Sukhopol is a rural locality (a village) in Inzersky Selsoviet, Arkhangelsky District, Bashkortostan, Russia. The population was 115 as of 2010. There are 2 streets.

Geography 
Sukhopol is located 21 km northeast of Arkhangelskoye (the district's administrative centre) by road. Valentinovka is the nearest rural locality.

References 

Rural localities in Arkhangelsky District